Nakuru Town East is a constituency in Kenya. It is one of eleven constituencies in Nakuru County. It was created in 2010 after Nakuru Town Constituency was split into Nakuru Town East and Nakuru Town West.

Members of Parliament

References 

Constituencies in Nakuru County